Giuseppe Figliomeni (born 2 June 1987) is an Italian footballer who plays as a defender for Serie C team Gozzano.

Career
Born in Reggio Calabria, Calabria, Figliomeni started his professional career at Calabrian team Crotone. He made his Serie B debut on 8 December 2006, replacing Dante López in the last minute. On 5 January 2007 he was loaned to Internazionale's Primavera under-20 team, winning the league champion. He also received call-up from Roberto Mancini to the first team, but did not play.

Inter did not bought him and Figliomeni returned to Crotone. He only played 19 league games before left for Lega Pro Prima Divisione club Arezzo. He left the club after Arezzo was expelled from the professional league by the Commissione di Vigilanza sulle Società di Calcio Professionistiche (Co.Vi.So.C.) of FIGC as the committee rejected to issue new license to Arezzo at the end of season.

In July 2010 he was signed by Serie B club Varese.  Figliomeni was loaned out for the second half of the 2011–12 season to Nocerina.  He was sold in co-ownership to fellow Serie B club Juve Stabia in July 2012. In June 2013 Varese gave up the remain 50% registration rights to Juve Stabia.

In August 2013 Figliomeni was jointly signed by Parma and Latina. On 20 June 2014 Latina signed Figliomeni outright, with Simone Addessi moved to opposite direction.

On 15 September 2014 Figliomeni left for fellow Serie B club Vicenza in another loan. On 28 January 2015 Figliomeni returned to Latina.

On 31 August 2016 Figliomeni was signed by Trapani.

On 20 July 2018, he signed a two-year contract with Serie C club Catanzaro.

On 15 January 2020, he moved to Gozzano.

References

External links
 Football.it Profile 
 

Italian footballers
Serie B players
Serie C players
F.C. Crotone players
Inter Milan players
S.S. Arezzo players
S.S.D. Varese Calcio players
A.S.G. Nocerina players
S.S. Juve Stabia players
Latina Calcio 1932 players
L.R. Vicenza players
Trapani Calcio players
Calcio Foggia 1920 players
U.S. Catanzaro 1929 players
A.C. Gozzano players
Association football central defenders
Sportspeople from Reggio Calabria
1987 births
Living people
Footballers from Calabria